René Lapierre (born 1953) is a Québécois writer and teacher. Mainly  a poet and essayist, he has published over the last 30 years more than twenty books, among which are several essays on writing and theories of creation, social criticism, and cultural spectacularization. He also published in magazines, in collective works or in social networks a lot of commitment texts, particularly in the context of 2012 Quebec student protests.

Since 1981, he has taught literature (literary creation, theory of forms, ethics, aesthetics, and theories of creation) in the Literary Studies Department at the University of Quebec in Montreal, where he had the opportunity to work with many prominent poets of Quebec.

Honors 
 2002 : Prix Victor-Barbeau de l'Académie des lettres du Québec
 2012 : Prix de poésie Estuaire - Bistro Leméac pour Pour les désespérés seulement
 2013 : Prix Alain-Grandbois de l'Académie des lettres du Québec pour Pour les désespérés seulement
 2013 : Prix du Gouverneur général : poésie de langue française pour Pour les désespérés seulement

Bibliography 
 Les masques du récit. Lecture de Prochain épisode de Hubert Aquin, Hurtubise HMH, coll. "Littérature", 1980, essai 
 L'imaginaire captif : Hubert Aquin, Les Quinze, coll. "Prose exacte", 1981, essai 
 Réédition: L'imaginaire captif : Hubert Aquin, L'Hexagone, coll. "TYPO", 1992, essai 
 Comme des mannequins, Primeur L'Échiquier, 1983, roman 
 Profil de l'ombre, Les Écrits des Forges, 1983, poésie 
 L'été Rébecca, Éditions du Seuil, 1985, roman 
 Une encre sépia, L'Hexagone, 1990, poésie 
 Effacement, L'Hexagone, 1991, poetry 
 Là-bas c'est déjà demain, Herbes rouges, 1994, poésie 
 Écrire l'Amérique, Herbes rouges, 1995, essay 
 Fais-moi mal Sarah, Herbes rouges, 1996, poésie 
 Viendras-tu avec moi, Herbes rouges, 1996, poésie 
 Love and Sorrow, Herbes rouges, 1998, poésie 
 L'entretien du désespoir. Essai sur l'affolement, Herbes rouges, 2001, essai 
 Piano, Herbes rouges, 2001, poetry 
 Figures de l'abandon, Herbes rouges, 2002, essai 
 L'Atelier vide, Herbes rouges, 2003, essai 
 L'Eau de Kiev, Herbes rouges, 2006, poésie 
 Traité de physique, Herbes rouges, 2008, poésie 
 Aimée soit la honte, Herbes rouges, 2010, poésie 
 Renversements. L'écriture-voix, Herbes rouges, 2011, essai 
 Pour les désespérés seulement, Herbes rouges, 2012, poésie  Prix Alain-Grandbois 2013. Prix du Gouverneur général : poésie de langue française 2013.

Notes 

1953 births
Writers from Quebec
Living people
Canadian male poets
Canadian poets in French
20th-century Canadian poets
21st-century Canadian poets
Governor General's Award-winning poets
Academic staff of the Université du Québec à Montréal
20th-century Canadian male writers
21st-century Canadian male writers
Prix Alain-Grandbois